Olga Athaide Craen LRAM (1913 – 1986) was an Indian pianist and piano educator, based in Mumbai.

Early life and education 
Olga Athaide was born in Goa, the daughter of Franklin Herculano Athaide and Ana Maria Luisa da Conceicao Cordeiro. Her mother was also a pianist. With a scholarship from the Sir Ratan Tata Trust, Athaide trained with Tobias Matthay and  completed her studies at the Royal Academy of Music in London in 1936.

Career 
During her student days in London, Athaide performed on radio and on British and continental concert stages, including Wigmore Hall in 1936. "Miss Athaide's performance showed a warm musical nature," commented one reviewer, "allied with exceptionally brilliant technic and facility." In 1938, she gave a recital at the Cowasji Jehangir Hall, and made her first of many appearances with the Bombay Symphony Orchestra. She returned to Cowasji Jehangir Hall in 1939, with a program of French composers, for the Alliance Française in Bombay. 

In 1946 Craen was one of the finalists of the Marguerite Long-Jacques Thibaud International Music Competition in Paris. In 1948, she and her husband faced difficulties when they illegally subleased a flat in India. Both were arrested, and her husband was convicted; he served a jail sentence of several years for the violation. The experience depleted their funds, and their health and reputations.

Craen gave public performances until the late 1950s, and taught piano in Mumbai into the 1980s. One of her successful students was Marialena Fernandes.

Personal life 
Athaide married Belgian violinist and conductor Jules Craen in 1939. She was widowed when Jules Craen died in 1959; she died from cancer in 1986. In 2013, to mark the centennial of her birth, the Olga & Jules Craen Foundation established the Young Musician of the Year competition.

References

External links 
The Olga & Jules Craen Foundation website

1913 births
1986 deaths
Indian women musicians
Women pianists
Indian pianists
People from Goa